Any Human Friend is the third full-length studio album by English musician Marika Hackman. It was released on 9 August 2019 by AMF Records, Virgin EMI Records and Sub Pop.

Critical reception

Any Human Friend received positive reviews from critics upon its release. At Metacritic, which assigns a normalised rating out of 100 to reviews from mainstream publications, the album received an average score of 84, based on 15 reviews.

Aimee Cliff of The Guardian praised the album, giving it a perfect score. In her review for The Independent, Alexandra Pollard called Any Human Friend "a blunt, bold album on which Hackman's beatific voice sits atop methodically messy instrumentals." Clare Martin of Paste gave the album a 9.3 out of 10, calling it "a treasure trove of zippy guitar hooks, glimmering synths and lemony vocals expertly curated by Hackman." Writing for PopMatters, Chris Ingalls called it "a quantum leap forward for Hackman, as the more fully-formed, full-band arrangements add a welcome element to her sharp lyrical content. The music is biting and arresting yet never manages to distract from what she's singing about. Rather, it creates new and exciting dimensions to what would have probably been great songs even with simple acoustic guitar accompaniment."

Track listing

Notes
All track titles are stylised in all lowercase.

Personnel
Credits adapted from liner notes.

Musicians
 Marika Hackman – vocals , guitar , bass guitar , synthesizer , piano , bells , drums , string arrangement 
 David Wrench – percussion , Hammond organ , tambourine , theremin 
 Jessica Batour – drums 
 Gillian Maguire – viola , violin 

Technical
 Marika Hackman – production , mixing , recording engineering 
 David Wrench – production , mixing , recording engineering 
 Grace Banks – recording engineering 
 Matt Colton – mastering 

Packaging
 Joost Vandebrug – cover photography
 Bridget Beorse – design
 Dusty Summers – design

Charts

References

2019 albums
Marika Hackman albums
AMF Records albums
Virgin EMI Records albums
Sub Pop albums